Platismatia tuckermanii is a species of corticolous (bark-dwelling), foliose lichen in the family Parmeliaceae. It was first formally described as a species of Cetraria in 1843 by American botanist William Oakes. The species epithet honours lichenologist Edward Tuckerman, who collected the type specimen in Cambridge, Massachusetts, in 1838. William and Chicita Culberson transferred the taxon to the genus Platismatia in 1968. The lichen is found in Canada and the Southeastern United States. Although usually encountered growing on conifer bark, it is also known to grow on old wooden fenceposts. It contains caperatic acid and atranorin as lichen products.

References

Parmeliaceae
Lichen species
Lichens described in 1843
Lichens of Canada
Lichens of the Southeastern United States